Since the establishment of the first weather station in Hakodate in 1872, Japan has recorded temperature changes across the country. Below is a list of the most extreme temperatures recorded in Japan.

It is worth noting that in the whole of Japan, the place with the lowest annual average temperature is not Hokkaido, but Mount Fuji at the junction of Shizuoka and Yamanashi prefecture. The only area with a negative value, Mount Fuji's extreme maximum temperature was only , which was measured on August 13, 1942.

Maximum temperatures

Minimum temperatures

References

External links

Climate of Japan
Weather events in Japan
Weather extremes of Earth
Japan